Gundamma Gari Krishnulu is a 1987 Telugu-language comedy film, produced by Midde Rama Rao under the Sri Rajalakshmi Art Pictures banner and directed by Relangi Narasimha Rao. It stars Rajendra Prasad, Subhalekha Sudhakar, Rajani, Poornima, and Nirmalamma. The music composed by Chakravarthy. The film was recorded as a Hit at the box office.

Plot
Gundamma is a bold, straightforward older woman with grandsons, Pedda Gopala Krishna / Peddodu & Chinna Gopala Krishna / Chinnodu respectively. Gundamma looks to marry off both, but Peddodu disagrees, for he wants a love marriage. The bride father's close friend Gangadharam's daughter Saroja. Unknowingly, Saroja joins in Peddodu's office and both of them start liking each other. Meanwhile, Chinnodu goes to fix up the match with a village girl, Lakshmi overseen by his grandmother. At first sight, he falls for her as luck would have it, she likes him as well. Eventually, Gangadharam moves to Peddodu to finalize the match, but he insults him and sends him out. Angered, Saroja reaches their house, but by mistake, she strikes Chinnodu. After that, Saroja finds out the truth and begins hating Peddodu. Both of them end up visiting a camp where they fall into the hands of a man called Gun Papa Rao), whose aim is to help lovers. He mistakes them as lovers and forcibly takes them along with him, but they somehow escape from him when they rekindle their love. Parallelly, Chinnodu's alliance with Lakshmi gets canceled, due to misunderstandings. So, Peddodu asks him to elope her. Chinnodu reaches their village and plans to run away. Unfortunately, Chinnodu is unable to catch the bus on time. Because of such impeccable timing, Lakshmi leaves the city alone, where she falls into the trap of Veeraraju, who runs a brothel house. Veeraraju's wife is good at nature who helps Lakshmi write a letter to Chinnodu which goes into the hands of Peddodu. Reading that letter, Saroja suspects and leaves him. Peddodu immediately rushes to protect Lakshmi. However, by that time, Veeraju finds that his wife is helping Lakshmi, so he beats her so badly that everyone believes that she is dead. Upon seeing this, Lakshmi escapes, and the blame falls upon Peddodu. At the same time, Chinnodu clears all the doubts of Saroja. Both of them go to meet Peddodu when they learn the entire story. Soon, all of them are in search of Lakshmi. At last, with the help of Gun Papa Rao, they prove their innocence. Finally, the movie ends on a happy note with the marriages of Peddodu with Saroja and Chinnodu with Lakshmi.

Cast

Rajendra Prasad as Pedda Gopala Krishna 
Rajani as Saroja
Subhalekha Sudhakar as Chinna Gopala Krishna 
Poornima as Lakshmi
Suthi Veerabhadra Rao as Gangadharam
Suthi Velu as Seetapati
Kota Srinivasa Rao as Gun Papa Rao
Benerjee as Mohan
Bhemiswara Rao as Lakshmi's father
Chidatala Appa Rao as Rikshawala
Dham
Sri Lakshmi as Gangadharam's second wife
Radha Kumari as Parvathi
Dubbing Janaki as Janaki
Nirmalamma as Gundamma

Soundtrack

Music composed by K. Chakravarthy was released on LEO Audio Company. Lyrics were written by Veturi and Sirivennela Seetharama Sastry.

Other
 VCDs and DVDs on - SHALIMAR Video Company, Hyderabad

References

Films scored by K. Chakravarthy
1980s Telugu-language films
Films directed by Relangi Narasimha Rao